Three ships of the Royal Navy have borne the name HMS Toronto. A fourth was renamed before being launched:

 was a schooner launched in 1799 and wrecked and subsequently broken up in 1811.
 was a schooner listed in 1813 and wrecked in 1817.
 was a wooden paddle steamer built as Sir Charles Adam in 1834 purchased in 1838 by the RN from the US and sold in 1843.
She was renamed  before her launch in 1943, and was broken up in 1957.

See also

Royal Navy ship names